Gamma Strike is a set of games originally written for the Commodore 64 and released by Gamesware in 1988.  The bundle included three games (Competition Shootout, Voyager 19, and Alien Team) together with a gun and target peripheral.

Reception 
ACE magazine described it as a "novel product aimed at the younger player, who'll probably get quite a bit of satisfaction from it".

References 

1988 video games
Amstrad CPC games
Commodore 64 games
Light gun games
ZX Spectrum games
Video games developed in the United Kingdom